The Ministry of Industry is the ministry of the  Government of Syria responsible for managing the industrial sector in the Syrian Arab Republic.

Organisation
Sections:
 Cost department 
 Department of Internal Control 
 Directorate of Legal Affairs 
 Technical Affairs Directorate 
 Production Department 
 Directorate of Administrative Development 
 Department of Informatics 
 Directorate of Organizing Craftsmen
 Directorate of Planning and International Relations
 Directorate of Financial Affairs
 Directorate of Administrative Affairs
 Industrial Investment Directorate * Marketing Department
 Press office

Responsibilities 
Management of public sector institutions, financing of companies and industrial institutions, regulation of the industrial sector.

A number of governmental institutions and companies belonging to it while the industrial bank is responsible for lending to private sector companies, as well as the chambers of industry in the provinces, and it also participates in the youth employment program in Syria.

See also
 Government ministries of Syria
 Ministry of Industry

References 
 

Industry in Syria
Economy of Syria
1958 establishments in Syria
Ministries established in 1958
Government ministries of Syria